Stanislav Gorkovenko (30 January 1938 – 26 November 2018) was a Soviet and Russian conductor from Baku who graduated from the Azerbaijan and Saint Petersburg Conservatories where he was under guidance from Nikolai Rabinovich. From 1967 to 1978 he was in charge of the Leningrad Music Hall Orchestra and since 1978 was a head conductor of the Solovyov-Sedoi Gubernatorial Orchestra. He is also an author of numerous songs and operas that are designed for children. One of his operas called Ognivo was staged at the Samara Opera and Ballet Theatre.

References

External links

1938 births
2018 deaths
Soviet conductors (music)
Baku Academy of Music alumni
20th-century Russian conductors (music)
Russian male conductors (music)
20th-century Russian male musicians
Musicians from Baku